The Zeiss Batis Distagon T* 2.8/18mm is a full-frame (FE) wide-angle prime lens for the Sony E-mount, announced by Zeiss on April 14, 2016.

Though designed for Sony's full frame E-mount cameras, the lens can be used on Sony's APS-C E-mount camera bodies, with an equivalent full-frame field-of-view of 27mm.

Build quality
The lens features a minimalist weather resistant plastic construction with a matte black finish and a rubber focus ring. On the top of the lens is the OLED display that highlights the focus distance and depth of field range of the lens, which can be set to display at all times, never, or only when focusing manually.

See also
 List of third-party E-mount lenses

References

Camera lenses introduced in 2016
Batis 2.8 18